Searching for the Roots of 9/11 is a documentary which aired on the Discovery Channel on March 26, 2003. It is hosted by New York Times foreign affairs columnist Thomas Friedman.

Content 

Searching for the Roots of 9/11 analyzes Arab and Muslim sentiment towards Americans and seeks to explain the factors that contributed and ultimately caused the terrorist attack on September 11, 2001 in an effort to help Americans better understand the tragedy and prevent similar events from occurring in the future. He feels that civilization cannot truly be safe until we understand the roots of 9/11, because if we don't fix the problems within civilization ("a war between the good guys and the bad guys"), we are going to continue to have a war between civilizations. At a time of war, he is searching for the answers to two fundamental questions: (1) what motivated the 19 young men to board planes to kill 3,000 of our American brothers and sisters, and (2) why did so many Arabs and Muslims applaud their actions?

Since 1981, Friedman has traveled widely covering Middle Eastern Affairs (including the 1982 Israeli invasion of Lebanon, the First Palestinian Intifada, and the ongoing Israeli-Palestinian Conflict) and has specialized in U.S. domestic politics and foreign policy, international economics, and the worldwide impact of the terrorist threat. By immersing himself in the Islamic culture, Friedman attempts to locate and articulate the source of the Muslims' intense anger towards Americans.

In this film, he explains the mixed feelings that Muslims had in response to 9/11 through a series of group and individual interviews. Many media outlets showed them dancing in the streets in response to the reports of the Twin Towers falling, and Dyab Abou Jahjah, a Muslim political leader residing in Belgium, explained his own perspective and what he believed was that of the others. He states that while it was disturbing for Muslims to see people jumping out of the windows to their deaths, Muslims instead chose to focus on the notion that America finally got punched in the nose. The passive support of 9/11 by Muslims can be attributed to the fact that America had been "kicking our butts for 50 years" and  that America itself educated the Muslims on the credence of killing. The bombing of Iraq killed Iraqi civilians, yet the Americans justified this with the viewpoint that accidental civilian casualties were regrettable, yet acceptable. In cheering 9/11, Muslims felt the same way about American civilians-their deaths were regrettable, but acceptable. Dyab Abou Jahjah makes clear that he abhors this logic but feels that it was Americans who encouraged Muslims to adopt it.

In a conversation with Rami Khouri, the editor of The Daily Star, a regional English-language newspaper published in Beirut and other Arab cities, Khouri eloquently expresses the biggest complaint that Arabs have against the United States. He stated in the documentary that the  "overarching feeling is that the US practices a double standard, promoting liberty, equality and justice at home but supporting autocracy, oligarchy, occupation and oppression in the Arab world." The Arabs feel that the US tries to boss around the world, and they resent Americans for their stance on foreign policy.

Friedman interviews Arab students at the Weill Cornell Medical College in Qatar, which is the first American medical school ever set up overseas. Lama Oreibi, a student, scolds the astonishment of the Americans in the aftermath of September 11. She agrees that the attacks that occurred on 9/11 were undoubtedly tragic, as everyone is against the killing of the innocent; however she argues that similar attacks are taking place daily in Palestine and previously in Lebanon. American acquiescence to these attacks on humanity is abhorrent. The only element that made 9/11 special is that it happened in the states, which propelled this event to an arguably unfair worldwide prominence. Suhaim Al-thani, a 16-year-old student at the same school, also feels as though Americans think that their blood is superior to Arabs. When asked what motivated 9/11, he responded, "Well I think seriously 9/11 is all about you see the blood of Arab people being spilled as if we were sheep. And you think that these people sitting in these big buildings and ruling the world think that their blood is expensive and that we are just animals. Palestinian blood isn't any cheaper than any other kind of blood. Whereas I've heard of an Arab empire, and I've never really heard of a Jewish empire and America is only 300 years old… so how is the Arab world backward and how is our blood cheap? In what sense?"

Friedman appears on Al Jazeera, a Qatar-based news network which gained worldwide notoriety following the attacks on September 11 when it broadcast videos made by Osama bin Laden and other al-Qaeda leaders decrying the United States and praising the attacks. Friedman also converses with Ali Salem, an Egyptian businessman who was compelled to write "An Apology From An Arab" to the American public, which appeared in Time magazine on the first anniversary of September 11. He explains that in the Middle East, art, education and the economy have been leveled to a ground zero. One of the causes of Arab resentment towards Americans is rooted in their own poverty of dignity. Their civilization, once the great Arab Empire, is lagging behind the rest of the world, and has regressed into a largely poor area devoid of real opportunity. This is illustrated by the Arab Human Development Report of 2002 which was issued by the US. It was reported that the combined GDP of all Arab Countries is less than that of Spain. More than half of Arab women are illiterate, and more than 51% of the Arab youth polled expressed a desire to emigrate outside of the Middle East if they had the opportunity. Coupled with that, there is a river of rage toward their own regime whose rampant corruption and repression has left them powerless and voiceless, and a growing animosity towards the US as they blame the American government for keeping their leaders in power.

Humiliation is referred to as "the single most underrated force in international relations." As Salem explain, the majority of Muslim extremists don't become radical religious zealots until they move to European host societies. The vast majority of Arabs living abroad are peaceful people. However, some young Arab and Muslim adults feel unwelcome by their host society. Freidman focuses on the current radical groups of Arabs who have felt frustrated by the discrimination they have faced after moving to Belgium.  He speaks with Fauzaya Talhaoui, a member of the Belgian Parliament, and Nordin Maloujahmoum, the head of the National Organization of Belgian Muslims. Maloujahmoum states that to have dignity in Belgium, you need to have a job and your worth as a person needs to be recognized by society. The discrimination that sometimes occurs against the Arab youth (preventing them from acquiring such jobs) puts them in a vulnerable position. Both Talhaoui and Maloujahmoum indicate that this feeling of inferiority and humiliation causes some Arab youth in these areas to harbor hate in their hearts, and propels them towards a more radical religious position. In reality, as Salem stated, "these extremists are pathologically jealous. They feel like dwarfs, which is why they search for towers and all those who tower mightily. Extremism may claim God as its redeemer, but it's really the selfish product of lunacy." Freidman links the experiences of the young Arabs in Belgium to the experiences of Mohamad Atta, one of the key leaders in the attacks of September 11.  These attacks couldn't have happened if there hadn't been radical leaders who exploited the anger of the hijackers. These hijackers felt injustice, and were bound, like a cult, by a utopian ideology developed by a charismatic leader.

Later, Friedman observes the ritual of Friday noon prayer at an important mosque in Cairo.  He is struck by the strong sense of spirituality, but soon after the prayer ends, the mosque is taken over by a group of young men who are political activists spreading an anti-American message to those who remained. Friedman observes that this mosque "instantly went from prayer to politics."

Yousuf Al Shirawi, the former Minister of Development and Industry for the country of Bahrain, allows Friedman to join him to cast his vote in Bahrain's first truly free election.  He comments on how excited Bahrainis are to vote and on the monumental achievement of this election.  This is their first election where women can both vote and run for office.  Though this one parliament election won't suddenly change this country, Friedman comments that, "everything starts with one step".

Friedman wraps up the documentary by making the assertion that "9/11 just might change the Arab and Muslim world even more than the United States. People in the Arab world have gone from shock that their sons could have perpetrated 9/11, to denial, to at least the beginning of introspection. The Arab world is facing a heightened struggle over what their relationship to America should be, and how to define themselves and their own societies." Friedman spent an evening with a group of contemporary young Egyptian business people who want their country to move towards prosperity and political openness, which has been largely rejected in the past. One of the men in this group, Basil El Baz, an Oil and Gas Executive commented that, "any change that takes place if it is to take place has to take place from within, it can't be induced, forced from abroad…not to force us but to support us. If you'll take a look, the friendliest Middle Eastern politicians have been educated in the United States and they've learned the American system and they've come home and they've wanted to try to implement that where they are. And what have you done after September 11th for 15 or 19 people? You've essentially put a wall around the United States by not allowing us entrance into the US to educate ourselves to maybe one day even build these institutions in our countries. How can we build a Harvard if we don't go to Harvard." While Arabs may at times reject American foreign policy with vigor, they also admire many aspects of American culture, including their education system. Omar Islam Shalaby recognizes that poverty, ignorance, and oppression may have been the causes of 9/11, but Arabs all want peace now. Arabs want to reach the stage where the battleground over Israel between the Arabs and the Jews ceases to exists, as Arabs want a better future for themselves and for their kids. Many Arabs are also learning to embrace democratic ideals. Since it has worked for many other civilized nations, many of these progressive thinkers feel it is in their best interest to make an attempt at democracy, and they feel that America should support them in this quest.

Friedman concludes: "How we manage the aftermath of the Iraq story and what kind of peace we try to construct out there will determine who wins: the mountains of suspicious, the rivers of rage, or the voices of moderation who really do want to partner with us [the Americans]."  Ali Salem observes that "God didn't create us to die, but to live. In order to survive and thrive as a civilization, we must live in accordance with others. We cannot live alone".  In "An Apology from an Arab," Salem concedes that Arab society may be temporarily backwards, but they are no different from the Americans. They too love freedom, and want a chance at a decent life."

External links
 Thomas Friedman's Personal Website

 Thomas Friedman's NYT webpage
 The Discovery Channel
 9/11 Commission
 Al-Jazeera network
 "Asking Why"
 "Support for Bin Laden, Violence Down Among Muslims"

Discovery Channel original programming
Documentary films about the September 11 attacks
Films shot in Bahrain